The Penalized Present Value (PPV) is a method of capital budgeting under risk developed by Fernando Gómez-Bezares in the 1980s, where the value of the investment is "penalized" as a function of its risk.

Method
PPV is best understood by comparison to two other approaches where a penalty is applied for risk:
The risk-adjusted rate of return applies a risk-penalty by increasing the discount rate when calculating the Net Present Value (NPV);
The certainty equivalent approach does this by adjusting the cash-flow numerators of the NPV formula (see Valuation using discounted cash flows #Basic formula for firm valuation using DCF model).
Contrasting to both, PPV calculates the average NPV (µ) at the risk-free rate, penalizing it afterwards by subtracting t standard deviations of the NPV (tσ):

The PPV has many versions, a particularly pragmatic one can be reached by assuming 
(i) we know the maximum or most optimistic NPV (b),
(ii) the minimum or most pessimistic one (a), 
(iii) these NPVs are approximately normally distributed, and may be calculated via the risk-free rate. 
Assuming a reasonable t of 1.5: 

Therefore, given that we are risk-averse, we weight more the worst case than the most favorable one. Obviously other weights could be applied.
According to this criterion, the decision maker will look for investments with positive PPVs, and if a choice is needed, he or she will choose the investment with the highest PPV.

Derivation 

A reasonable derivation of the PPV is the PIRR (Penalized Internal Rate of Return), which can be useful, among other things, to measure the performance of an investment fund or an investment portfolio. Assuming that μIRR and σIRR are, respectively, the mean and the standard deviation of the Internal Rate of Return (IRR), and following the reasoning above we will have:

Now calling r0 the risk-free rate, μ* the average return of the market portfolio and σ* its standard deviation, we can do:

which is the value of the Sharpe ratio of the market portfolio (premium per unit of risk σ asked by the market). So we can do:

This would be the linear version of the well-known Sharpe ratio.

References 
Gómez-Bezares, F. (1993): "Penalized present value: net present value penalization with normal and beta distributions", in Aggarwal, ed., Capital budgeting under uncertainty, Prentice-Hall, Englewood Cliffs, New Jersey, pages 91–102.
Gómez-Bezares, F. y F.R. Gómez-Bezares (2015): “Don’t use quotients to calculate performance”, Cogent Economics and Finance, 3: 1065584, vol. 3, no. 1, pages 1-14. Open access: http://www.tandfonline.com/doi/full/10.1080/23322039.2015.1065584
Gómez-Bezares, F. and F.R. Gómez-Bezares (2022): “An analysis of risk treatment in the field of finance”, in C.-F. Lee & A.C. Lee, eds., Encyclopedia of finance, Springer, Suiza, 3rd ed., pages 1397-1409.
More information

Corporate finance
Capital budgeting
Valuation (finance)